Notopleura may refer to:
 Notopleura (plant), a genus of Neotropical plants in the family Rubiaceae
 Notopleura (grasshopper), a genus of North African, Eremogrylline grasshoppers

Genus disambiguation pages